Lynn Lavner is an American comedian and musician from Brooklyn, New York. Much of her material is based around the facts that she is Jewish and a lesbian. She is frequently billed as "America's Most Politically Incorrect Entertainer."

Lavner began her career in 1981 when she wrote the music to the lesbian-themed play Ladies! Don't Spit and Holler!. After a showing of the play a fan came up to her and asked if the soundtrack was available on the album. When Lavner told her it wasn't, the fan, who had recently inherited a large amount of money, offered to put up the money so the soundtrack could be adapted into an album.

Lavner's musical style harkens back to Tin Pan Alley pop. Lavner lists some of her major influences as George Gershwin, Irving Berlin, and Cole Porter. Lavner initially was inspired to begin playing piano by her father, who played to entertain company.

Quotes
 "There are 6 admonishments in the Bible concerning homosexual activity and our enemies are always throwing them up to us usually in a vicious way and very much out of context. What they don't want us to remember is that there are 362 admonishments in the Bible concerning heterosexual activity. I don't mean to imply by this that God doesn't love straight people, only that they seem to require a great deal more supervision." from Butch Fatale

Discography
 Ladies! Don't Spit and Holler!, 1981 (available on vinyl only)
 Something Different, 1983 (available on vinyl and cassette)
 I'd Rather Be Cute, 1986 (available on vinyl and cassette)
 You Are What You Wear, 1988 (available on CD, vinyl, and cassette)
 Butch Fatale, 1992 (available on CD and cassette)

References

External links
 Tribute Page

Jewish American comedians
Jewish American musicians
Lesbian comedians
American lesbian musicians
LGBT Jews
American LGBT singers
Living people
People from Queens, New York
Traditional pop music singers
Year of birth missing (living people)
20th-century American comedians
21st-century American comedians
Jewish American female comedians
20th-century American LGBT people
21st-century American LGBT people
21st-century American Jews
American LGBT comedians